"Living Eyes" is a power ballad recorded by the Bee Gees and was released in November 1981 as the second single and title track off the LP of the same name. It was written by Barry, Robin & Maurice Gibb. The sound of this single was closer musically to the rest of the album than its predecessor, "He's a Liar".

Release
The song starts in A minor with synthesizer played by Albhy Galuten blended with Barry's voice (mimicking the synthesizer line). On the verses, Barry sings low and high harmony.

"Living Eyes" was a top ten hit in Austria. It peaked at No. 45 on the US Billboard Hot 100 in late 1981; which marked the end of the Gibbs' Top 40 singles streak which began in 1975 with "Jive Talkin'".

Record World called it " a simple, poignant ballad that finds its strength in the trio's trademark harmonies."

On its promotional video, Barry, Robin and Maurice perform in front of an audience of children with Barry and Maurice on acoustic guitars while Robin was the only one that didn't play any instruments. The video was later premiered on Solid Gold.

Personnel
 Barry Gibb – lead and harmony vocal, acoustic guitar
 Robin Gibb – backing vocal
 Maurice Gibb – backing vocal, acoustic guitar
 Richard Tee – piano
 Albhy Galuten – synthesizers
 Chuck Kirkpatrick – guitar
 George Terry – guitar
 Jeff Porcaro – drums
 Ralph McDonald – percussion

Charts

References

Bee Gees songs
1981 singles
1981 songs
Songs written by Barry Gibb
Songs written by Robin Gibb
Songs written by Maurice Gibb
Song recordings produced by Barry Gibb
Song recordings produced by Robin Gibb
Song recordings produced by Maurice Gibb
RSO Records singles
Pop ballads
Rock ballads
Song recordings produced by Albhy Galuten